Athylia is a genus of beetles in the family Cerambycidae, containing the following species:

 Athylia albomarmorata Breuning, 1943
 Athylia avara Pascoe, 1864
 Athylia drescheri (Fisher, 1936)
 Athylia fasciata (Fisher, 1936)
 Athylia fisheri (Gilmour, 1948)
 Athylia flavovittata (Breuning, 1938)
 Athylia fusca Fisher, 1925
 Athylia fuscosticta Breuning & Jong, 1941
 Athylia fuscovittata Breuning, 1939
 Athylia gressitti (Gilmour, 1948)
 Athylia laevicollis (Pascoe, 1859)
 Athylia nobilis Breuning, 1960
 Athylia ornata Fisher, 1925
 Athylia persimilis Breuning, 1939
 Athylia pulcherrima (Breuning, 1938)
 Athylia pulchra (Fisher, 1925)
 Athylia punctithorax Breuning, 1939
 Athylia quadristigma (Gressitt, 1940)
 Athylia signata (Pic, 1926)
 Athylia similis (Fisher, 1925)
 Athylia tholana (Gressitt, 1940)
 Athylia vanessoides Breuning, 1956
 Athylia venosa (Pascoe, 1864)
 Athylia viduata (Pascoe, 1864)

References

 
Cerambycidae genera